Mihály Víg (born 1957, Budapest) is a Hungarian composer, poet, songwriter, guitarist, singer and actor.

Career 
Born into a family of musicians. He is the co-founder of bands Trabant (1980–1986) and Balaton (1979–present). Although the bands' songs were not officially released in the 1980s, they became underground hits. He composed film scores for the films of János Xantus, András Szirtes, Ildikó Szabó, Péter Müller Sziámi and Béla Tarr. He also plays the lead role - Irimiás - in the film Sátántangó. His score for the film The Turin Horse was nominated for the European Film Prize for Best Composer in 2011. He also appears in the cast of Gábor Fabricius' film Eltörölni Frankot.

Personal life 
In 1986, at the invitation of Tamás Pajor, he and his wife became members of the Faith Church. After a short time he left the religious community in disappointment, but the memory of this bitter encounter stayed with him for the rest of his life, and for a long time caused him a creative crisis. In 2020, he made serious accusations in László Bartus's book, Fesz lesz, against the congregation and personally against Sándor Németh, the leading pastor of the congregation, in connection with the loss of his wife and son.

Awards 

 In 2003 he was awarded the Magyar Köztársasági Érdemrend lovagkeresztje polgári tagozata (Knight of Cross from the Order of Merit of the Hungarian Republic). 
 In 2008 he was awarded the Film Composer of the Year prize at the EU XXL Film Festival in Vienna.

Filmography 

 Eszkimó asszony fázik, (composer) 1983 (Hungarian film)
 Ex-kódex, (composer, actor) (1983) (Hungarian film)
 Őszi almanach, (composer)  1984 (Hungarian film)
 Kárhozat, (composer) 1988 (Hungarian film)
 Rocktérítő, (composer)  1988 (Hungarian film)
 Az utolsó hajó, (composer)  1990 (Hungarian film)
 Sátántangó, (composer, actor) 1994 (Hungarian film)
 Utazás az Alföldön, (composer)  1995 (Hungarian film)
 Werckmeister harmóniák, (composer)  2000 (Hungarian-German-French-Italian film drama)
 A londoni férfi, (composer)  2007 (French-German-Hungarian-English film drama)
 Saját halál, (composer)  2008 (Hungarian film)
 The Turin Horse, (composer) 2011 (Hungarian-French-German-Swiss film drama)
 Daymark (composer)  2011 (Norwegian-Hungarian film drama)
 NémetEgység @ Balatonnál - Mézföld (composer)  2011 (Hungarian film)
 A kert (composer)  2012 (Hungarian film)
 A hosszú út hazafelé (composer)  2013 (Hungarian film)
 Genezis (composer)  2018 (Hungarian film)
 Rengeteg - Mindenhol látlak (actor) 2021 (Hungarian film)
 Eltörölni Frankot (actor) 2021 (Hungarian film)

Discography
 Film music from the films of Béla Tarr (2001)
 Balaton 1985. 04. 27. magnetic tape only
 Balaton II. (concert and home-made recordings, 1992)
 A fény közepe a sötétség kapujában (1996)
 1979-2009 (compilation, 2009)
 1987.03.27 - Inota (concert recording)

Bibliography 
Versek és novellák (versek, dalszövegek, novellák, forgatókönyvek, színdarabok; Bahia Music Kiadó, Budapest, 1996

References

External links 
 
 
 Berlin Literature Festival

Living people
1957 births
Hungarian film score composers
Male film score composers
Musicians from Budapest